This is a list of episodes of the 1990s sitcom, Ellen, which aired on ABC from March 29, 1994, to July 22, 1998. A total of 109 episodes were produced.

Series overview

Episodes

Season 1 (1994)

Season 1 list is missing episode 12 and 13 ? "The Tape" and "the Mugging"

Season 2 (1994–95)

Season 3 (1995–96)

Season 4 (1996–97)

Season 5 (1997–98)

See also
List of awards and nominations received by Ellen

Notes
Two episodes that aired in Season 3, The Tape and The Mugging were filmed at the same time as Season 1 and are included in the Season 1 DVD box set as "bonus episodes", and are not included in the Season 3 one.

.
Lists of American sitcom episodes